Mehdi Khchab (born 14 August 1991) is a Belgian footballer who is currently playing for RSC Andenne. He last played for Cercle Brugge KSV in the Belgian First Division B as a right-back.

External links

1991 births
Living people
Belgian footballers
Cercle Brugge K.S.V. players
Challenger Pro League players
Association football fullbacks
RAAL La Louvière players